Greer House is a historic home located at Rocky Mount, Franklin County, Virginia. It is a two-story, three bay, frame dwelling in the Greek Revival style.  It has a low hipped roof and is sheathed on weatherboard. The front facade features a full width, one-story front porch topped by a balustrade. The building was started in 1861. It was originally "T"-shaped, until a series of three small building campaigns altered the form of the dwelling to resemble a square.

It was listed on the National Register of Historic Places in 1990.

References

Houses on the National Register of Historic Places in Virginia
Houses completed in 1861
Greek Revival houses in Virginia
Houses in Franklin County, Virginia
National Register of Historic Places in Franklin County, Virginia
1861 establishments in Virginia